Morten Piil (1 March 1943 – 22 March 2018) was a Danish writer and film critic. He received a Bodil Honorary Award in 2002 for his "long-standing contribution to Danish film literature".

Piil was a film critic at Berlingske Tidende 1962–67, and has since then been at Dagbladet Information where he has also written about literature and rock music. He was a film consultant at the Danish Film Institute 1975–77, and 1968-96 consultant for DR's film department.

Piil has written several reference works on Danish cinema. His three books published on Gyldendal, Danske filmskuespillere ("Danish film actors") (2001), a monograph on 525 actors active in the period 1930–2001, Danske filminstruktører ("Danish filmmakers") (2005), detailing 120 Danish film directors active between 1930 and 2005, and Gyldendals danske filmguide ("Gyldendals Danish film guide") (2008), a description of 1200 Danish feature films — virtually every major film release from 1930 to 2008, poses with a total volume of approximately 1,800 pages the most comprehensive survey of Danish film and the main figures behind it.

In 2003, Information published Film på hjernen: 40 års bedste biografoplevelser a 664-page selection of his film criticism from the last 40 years.

Piil has translated three works of Vladimir Nabokov to Danish.

Selected works

References

External links
 
 Morten Piil at Dagbladet Information

1943 births
2018 deaths
Danish male writers
Danish film critics
Danish music critics
People from Copenhagen
Bodil Honorary Award recipients